Pagidyala is a village in Nandyal district of Andhra Pradesh, India.

Geography
It has an average elevation of 269 meters (885 feet).

References

Villages in Nandyal district